Potomac Senior High School is a public secondary school in unincorporated Prince William County, Virginia, United States; just outside Dumfries.

Potomac Senior High School, which serves the nearby incorporated town of Dumfries was established in 1981. When the school first opened there were only freshmen and the students went to school. Originally the campus was located at 15941 Cardinal Drive (Woodbridge address), what is now the Dr. A. J. Ferlazzo Building.  A year and a half later the current school was opened up and the freshmen and sophomores moved there during the Christmas break.  The current school is at 3401 Panther Pride Drive (Dumfries, Virginia address). Panther Pride Drive was originally named "Four Year Trail." The name was changed by official decree of the school board on April 25, 2007.

In 1983 Potomac had its first graduating class of approximately 400 students. Students from both Graham Park Middle School, Rippon Middle School, and the new Potomac Middle School continue their education at Potomac High School.

In May 2007, Newsweek ranked Potomac 804th on its annual list of "Best High Schools in America." In 2008 and 2009, Newsweek ranked Potomac 265 out of 1,500 best public schools in America.

Demographics

In the 2017-2018 school year, Potomac's student body was:
56.6% Black/African American
24.4% Hispanic 
11.6% White
8.2% Asian
4.6% Two or More Races
.4% American Indian/Alaskan
.2% Hawaiian/Pacific Islander

State champions
VHSL Record Book

Teams
 1983 Baseball
 1985 Softball
 1988 Baseball
 1995 Boys Basketball
 1999 Boys Indoor Track
 1999 Boys Outdoor Track
 2000 Boys Indoor Track
 2014 Boys Basketball
 2016 Boys Basketball
 2017 Boys Outdoor Track

Individuals
 1983 Anthony Thomas Wrestling (119 lb)
 2001 Chad Malone Wrestling (189 lb)
 2011 Anthony Williams Track and Field (300m Hurdles)
 2017 Donovan Louis Track and Field (Long Jump)
 2017 Donovan Louis Track and Field (55m Dash)
 2017 Donovan Louis Track and Field (Long Jump)
 2018 Donovan Louis Track and Field (55m Dash)
 2019 Matthew Mitchell Track and Field (55m Hurdles)

Student groups
 Marching Band
 Winter Color Guard

Extracurricular activities
The Pride of Potomac Marching Panthers is a 17 year  Virginia Honor Band, and is affiliated with the Virginia Band and Orchestra Director's Association, or VBODA.

Cambridge program for mathematics and physical sciences

Potomac Senior High School hosts the Cambridge Program for Mathematics and Physical Sciences which is an international curriculum offering broad and balanced study for academically able students. The Cambridge curriculum aims to encourage the skills of independent research and investigation, the use of initiative and creativity and the application of knowledge and skills.

Cambridge Scholars are students who take and pass six or more AICE level examinations.

Potomac Senior High School has removed all AP classes aside from AP US Government for the 2008-2009 school year and now only offers Cambridge courses.

Test scores
Potomac Senior High School is a fully accredited high school based on its performance on the Virginia Standards of Learning tests.  Its SAT average in 2005 was a 923 (463 in Verbal; 460 in Math)

Notable alumni
 Brian Fitzgerald, Former MLB player (Seattle Mariners)
Edward Simms (Football) Former NFL Player (Philadelphia Eagles)
 Cliff Hawkins, all-state selection as a sophomore at Potomac and professional basketball player
 Craig Novitsky '89 (Football) at UCLA and three years with the (New Orleans Saints)
 Tim Raley, first team All America in baseball at Wichita State in 1987 
 Keenan Carter, college Football Player University of Virginia
 Abdul Kanneh, Former NFL Player (Cleveland Browns)
Tommy Thigpen, was a three-time All-ACC linebacker for the UNC Tar Heels, and was later drafted by the NY Giants.
Captain Brian Letendre (USMC) KIA -Al Anbar Province, Iraq 05/03/2006 Class of 1996

References

Board Briefs April 25, 2007

External links

Potomac High School Booster Club

Prince William County Public Schools
Class of 1983
Class of 1986
Class of 1996

Educational institutions established in 1979
Public high schools in Virginia
Schools in Prince William County, Virginia
1979 establishments in Virginia